Mariette Elizabeth "Ettie" Rheiner Garner (July 17, 1869 – August 17, 1948) was the wife of John Nance Garner, the 32nd vice president of the United States, and thus second lady of the United States from 1933 to 1941.

Biography 
Mariette Elizabeth "Ettie" Rheiner Garner was born in Sabinal, Texas, to John Peter Rheiner, a Swiss immigrant who became a Texas rancher, and his first wife, the former Mary Elizabeth Watson.

In 1893, although women in Texas could not vote at the time, Mariette Rheiner ran for Uvalde County judge. She was defeated by the incumbent, John Nance Garner. Two years later, on November 25, 1895, she married Garner in Sabinal, Texas. They had one child, a son, Tully Charles Garner (1896–1968). In an interview  in 1940, she denied running against Garner.  

During her husband's tenure in the U.S. House of Representatives, from 1903 to 1933, Ettie Garner served as his private secretary.

She suffered from Parkinson's disease from 1942 to 1948, slipped into a two-day coma and died in Uvalde, Texas, on August 17, 1948, a month after her 79th birthday.

References

External links 

|-

1869 births
1948 deaths
American people of Swiss-German descent
People from Sabinal, Texas
Second ladies of the United States
Spouses of Texas politicians